A Bhilala is a tribe found in the Malwa and Nimar of the Central Provinces and in Central India. The total strength of the Bhilalas is about 150,000 persons, most of whom reside in the Bhopawar Agency, adjoining Nimar. Only 15,000 were returned from the Central Provinces in 1911. The Bhilalas are commonly considered, and the general belief may in their case be accepted as correct, to be a mixed caste sprung from the invading immigrant  Rajputs with  Bhils of the Central India hills. The original term was not improbably Bhilwala, and may have been applied to those Rajput chiefs, a numerous body, who conquered small estates in the Bhil country, or to those who took the daughters of Bhil chieftains to wife. The bhilalas in the central province are descendants of male Rajput with female Bhils and take the name of the Rajput clan to which they trace their origin. The Bhilalas are landholders and live like mukhis, darbar or thakur.

Systematic anthropological research of Bhilala communities began in the 1960s with a study of two of their regional subgroups, the Rathwa Bhilala and Barela Bhilala although they had been recorded as early as 1832. 
In that year, John Malcolm used the term Bhilala to describe people of Bhil-Rajput descent and his usage has persisted, although in 1908 Michael Kennedy, another colonial administrator, preferred a more refined classification of such people as being any one of Baria, Dangi, Parmar, Rathwa and Rathod. The co-mingling probably has its origins in the medieval period when Rajputs fleeing southwards from the Muslim invasion of India, conquered and took control of Bhil settlements, taking Bhil women for marriage.

Bhilala Dynasty

Several Bhilala families hold estates in Nimar and Indore, and their chiefs now paradoxically claim to be "pure" Rajputs. The main Bhilala houses, as those of Bhamgarh, Selani and Mandhata, do not inter-marry with the rest of their original caste, but only among themselves and with other families of the same standing in Malwa and Holkar's Nimar. On succession to the Gaddi or headship of the house, representatives of these families are marked with a tilaka or badge on the forehead and sometimes presented with a sword, and the investiture may be carried out by custom by the head of another house. Bhilala landholders usually have the title of Rao or Rawat. Ironically and ahistorically, they do not admit that a Bhilala can now spring from intermarriage between a Rajput and a Bhil. The Bhilala Rao of Mandhata is hereditary custodian of the great shrine of Siva at Onkar Mandhata on an island in the Nerbudda. According to the mythological family traditions, their ancestor, Bharat Singh, was a Chauhan Rajput, who took Mandhata from Nathu Bhil in A.D. 1165, and restored the worship of Siva to the island, which had been made inaccessible to pilgrims by the terrible deities, Kali and Bhairava, devourers of human flesh.

1. BHARUDPURA, BHUMIA RAJA THAKUR UDAI SINGH
chiefs were Chouhan Rajput of Anjana section Belongs to a Bhilala family, born about 1848; succeeded to the gadi In 1858. The population of the State was 1724, mainly Hindus. Area of the state was 57 km2 and revenue was Rs 6000/-.
Residence. Bharudpura, Bhopawar, Central India.

2. CHHOTA BARKHERA, BHUMIA RAJA  THAKUR MUGAT SINGH
Born 1865 ; succeeded to the gadi 14 September 1889. He was descended from a Bhilala family and was a chouhan rajput. The population of the State was about 1259, mainly Hindus. Area of the state was 60 km2 and revenue was Rs  5000/-
Residence. Chhota Barkhera, Bhopawar, Central India.

Chauhan Bhilala
The tradition of the tribe says that,
after the Ghurid invasion around 200,000 Chauhans fled to Mewar and after Alauddin Khalji's invasion many fled to the Vindhya hills and took Bhil women in marriage. These male Chauhans "lost their caste" and were called Bhilalas. The Chauhan Bhilalas gained importance during the Pindari raids in Central India by enlisting under the Holkar rulers, one of the famous Chauhan Bhilala's during this period was Nadir Singh, the Bhumia of Jamnia.

References

Further reading 

Bhil clans
Ethnic groups in India